White rust may refer to:

Albugo candida, a type of plant pathogen known as "white rust"
Albugo occidentalis, white rust of spinach
Wilsoniana bliti, a type of plant pathogen known as "white rust"
Wet storage stain, a type of corrosion on zinc products
Puccinia horiana, causative agent of Chrysanthemum white rust, a plant disease